Sreten Damjanović (born 10 October 1946) is a retired lightweight Greco-Roman wrestler from Serbia. He won the world title in 1971 and placed second in 1969 and 1973. He also competed at the 1968 and 1972 Summer Olympics. In 1971, he received the Golden Badge as Yugoslav athlete of the year.

References

External links
 

1946 births
Living people
Sportspeople from Belgrade
Serbian male sport wrestlers
Olympic wrestlers of Yugoslavia
Wrestlers at the 1968 Summer Olympics
Wrestlers at the 1972 Summer Olympics
Yugoslav male sport wrestlers
World Wrestling Championships medalists
Mediterranean Games gold medalists for Yugoslavia
Mediterranean Games silver medalists for Yugoslavia
Competitors at the 1967 Mediterranean Games
Competitors at the 1971 Mediterranean Games
Mediterranean Games medalists in wrestling
European Wrestling Championships medalists